McAdenville Historic District is a national historic district located at McAdenville, Gaston County, North Carolina.  It encompasses 93 contributing buildings, 2 contributing sites, and 7 contributing structures in the mill village associated with McAden Mills, a cotton mill chartered by the state legislature in 1881. The buildings were built between about 1884 and 1959, and include notable examples of Late Victorian and Italianate architecture. Notable buildings include 15 brick mill worker houses, remnants of McAden Mill No. 1 (1881–82) and McAden Mill No. 2 (1884–85), McAden Mill No. 3 (1906–07), and Pharr Corporate Offices (1906, c. 1955, c.1965) redesigned by Earle Sumner Draper.

It was listed on the National Register of Historic Places in 2009.

References

Historic districts on the National Register of Historic Places in North Carolina
Victorian architecture in North Carolina
Italianate architecture in North Carolina
Buildings and structures in Gaston County, North Carolina
National Register of Historic Places in Gaston County, North Carolina
Company towns in North Carolina